Torana ([tawr-uh-nuh]) is a free-standing ornamental or arched gateway for ceremonial purposes in Hindu, Buddhist and Jain architecture of the Indian subcontinent. Toranas can also be widely seen in Southeast Asia and parts of East Asia. Chinese Shanmen gateways, Japanese torii gateways, Korean Iljumun gateways, Vietnamese Tam quan gateways, and Thai Sao Ching Cha were derived from the Indian torana. They are also referred to as vandanamalikas.

History

Indologist art historian and archaeologist Percy Brown has traced the origin of torana from the grama-dvara (village-gateways) of the vedic era (1500 BCE – 500 BCE) village which later developed as a popular adornment for cities, places. sacred shrines. According to the vedic text, the Arthasastra, the gateways of different forms were to adorn the entrance to a city or a palace.

A granite stone fragment of an arch discovered by K. P. Jayaswal from Kumhrar, Pataliputra has been analysed as a pre Mauryan Nanda period keystone fragment of a trefoil arch of gateway with mason's marks of three archaic Brahmi letters inscribed on it which probably decorated a torana. The wedge shaped stone with indentation has mauryan polish on two sides and was suspended vertically.

In Mauryan Empire, the archaeological evidence shows the Torana of Sanchi stupa dates back to 3rd century BCE. The Sanchi torana and architecture is imitation of timber and brick construction in stone, which was popular feature in Indian architecture before 3rd century BCE.

In Kalinga architecture we can see the Toran in many temples built from the 7th to 12th centuries. Jagannath Temple, Puri, Rajarani Temple and Mukteswar Temple are the few example of Kalinga architecture having torana.

In Gujarat, several toranas built during reign of Chaulukya dynasty (10th-12th century). They were mostly associated with temples.

Types of torana

There are many different types of toranas, such as, patra-torana (on the scrolls or gateway adornment made of leaves), puspa-torana (made of flowers), ratna-torana (made of precious stones), stambha-torana (made on pillars), citra-torana (made of paintings), bhitti-torana (adornment made on walls, such as over the wall recess or false portals and windows, could even be a specific type of wall painting) and dvara-toranas (appended adornment over a gateway (e.g. toran) or an adorned gateways itself). These are mentioned in the medieval Indian architectural treatises.

Socio-religious significance of torana

Torana is a sacred or honorific gateway in Buddhist and Hindu architecture. Its typical form is a projecting cross-piece resting on two uprights or posts. It is made of wood or stone, and the cross-piece is generally of three bars placed one on the top of the other; both cross-piece and posts are usually sculpted.

Toranas are associated with Buddhist stupas like the Great Stupa in Sanchi, as well as with Jain and Hindu structures, and also with several secular structures. Symbolic toranas can also be made of flowers and even leaves and hung over the doors and at entrances, particularly in Western and Southern India. They are believed to bring good fortune and signify auspicious and festive occasions. They can also serve didactic and narrative purposes or be erected to mark the victory of a king.

During the Vesak festival of Sri Lanka it is a tradition to erect electrically illuminated colorful Vesak toranas in public places. These decorations are temporary installations which remain in public display for couple of weeks starting from the day of Vesak.

Thorana (Vesak)
During the Vesak festival of Sri Lanka it is a tradition to erect electrically illuminated colorful Vesak Pandols (Thorana) in public places (usually organized by communities, trade organisations). These decorations are temporary installations which remain in public display for couple of weeks starting from the day of Vesak. Moreover, these large structures attracts so many locals in Sri Lanka, and also foreign people from around the world.

Usage outside India

East and Southeast Asia 

Many places that were part of the Greater India and Indosphere were Indianised, as great deal of cultural exchange with India took place in ancient times, examples of cultural and religious practices influenced by the Indian practices include Thai, Chinese, Korean, Japanese and other South Asian, East Asian and Southeast Asian cultures. For example, Benzaiten is a Japanese name for the Hindu goddess Saraswati, and the ancient Siddhaṃ script, which disappeared from India by 1200 CE, is still written by monks in Japan.

Ancient Indian torna sacred gateway architecture has influenced gateway architecture across Asia specially where Buddhism was transmitted from India; Chinese paifang gateways Japanese torii gateways, Korean hongsalmun gateway, and Sao Ching Cha in Thailand have been derived from the Indian torana. The functions of all are similar, but they generally differ based on their respective architectural styles.

Torana Gate, Malaysia, a torana gateway) in Brickfields in Kuala Lumpur, is a gift from the Government of India to Malaysia, construction of which in design identical to the Sanchi Stupa was completed in 2015.

Torii in Japan

The torii, a gateway erected on the approach to every Shinto shrine, was derived from the Indian torana. According to several scholars, the vast evidence shows how the torii, both etymologically and architecturally, were originally derived from the torana, a free-standing sacred ceremonial gateway which marks the entrance of a sacred enclosure, such as Hindu-Buddhist temple or shrine, or city.

Hongsalmun gateways in Korea

The hongsalmun is a gate for entering a sacred place in Korea. It is arranged by two round poles set vertically and two transverse bars. It has no roof and door-gate, and placed on the middle top gate is a symbol of the trisula and the taegeuk image. Hongsalmun are usually erected to indicate Korean Confucian sites, such as shrines, tombs, and academies such as hyanggyo and seowon.

Paifang in China

The paifang, also known as a pailou, is a traditional style of Chinese architectural arch or gateway structure. Originally derived from Indian torana through the introduction of Buddhism to China, it has evolved into many styles and has been introduced to other East Asian countries such as Korea, Japan, and Vietnam.

Gallery

Toranas in India

Toranas overseas

Derived styles

See also
 Toran, ceremonial Indian door decoration
 Torii, in Japan architecture
 Paifang, in Chinese architecture
 Hongsalmun, in Korean architecture with both religious and other usage 
 Iljumun, portal in Korean temple architecture
 Tam quan, in Vietnamese architecture

References

Citations

Bibliography 
 Joseph Needham: Science and Civilization in China, Vol. 4, part 3, pp. 137–138.
 Ram Nath (1995): Studies in Medieval Indian Architecture. M.D. Publications Pvt. Ltd. 172 pages. 
 Nick Edwards, Mike Ford, Devdan Sen, Beth Wooldridge, David Abram (2003): The Rough Guide to India. Rough Guides. 1440 pages. .

External links

Types of gates
Buddhist architecture
Hindu architecture
Hindu temple architecture
Architecture in India